"The God Abandons Antony" (also translated as "The God Forsakes Antony") is a poem by Constantine P. Cavafy, published in 1911.

Story
The poem refers to Plutarch's story of how Antony, besieged in Alexandria by Octavian, heard the sounds of instruments and voices of a procession making its way through the city, then passing out; the god Bacchus (Dionysus), Antony's protector, was deserting him; the poem's title itself is a verbatim quotation from Plutarch's text.

Excerpt

Adaptations
Leonard Cohen and Sharon Robinson freely adapted this poem for their song "Alexandra Leaving" (Ten New Songs, 2001). Whereas Cavafy's theme was based around the city of Alexandria, Cohen's version builds around a woman named Alexandra.

References

External links
Poem in Greek and English translation thereof (by Edmund Keeley and Philip Sherrard) at the Official Site of the Cavafy Archive

1911 poems
Dionysus
Ancient Alexandria in art and culture
Fiction set in the 1st century BC
Historical poems
Poems by Constantine P. Cavafy